Shining Star (Persian title: Setareh Forouzan- )  is a 1969 Iranian Persian-genre drama film directed by Assadolah Soleymanifar and starring Forouzan, Soraya Beheshti, Ahmad Ghadakchian, Ebrahim Fakhar, Farhad Mohabbat, Farangiss Forouhar and Yadollah Mohammadi Nejad (Yadi).

References

1969 films
1969 romantic drama films
1960s Persian-language films
Iranian romantic drama films